Yoshinobu Miyake (:jp:三宅善信 Miyake Yoshinobu, born July 27, 1958) is a Japanese Shinto priest and scholar.  Rev. Miyake was appointed the Superior General of Konko Church of Izuo in 2006 and appointed Chair of the Board of International Shinto Studies Association in 2013.

Personal background and the Miyake family

Born in Osaka, Rev. Yoshinobu Miyake worked as a Shinto priest after graduating from Divinity School of Doshisha University, Konko Theological Seminary and Center for the Study of World Religions in Harvard University.

As a scholar he belongs to the Japanese Association for Religious Studies, the International Shinto Studies Association, and the Conference on Religion and Modern Society.
His grandfather Rev. Toshio Miyake (1903–1999) was Founder of the Konko Church of Izuo and established many interfaith organizations such as Religions for Peace and the International Religious Fellowship, and humanitarian aid programs such as the Asian Youth Centre of the World Federalist Movement, and Miyake Homes & Schools in South Asian countries.
He has received honorary doctorates from Meadville Lombard Theological School, Chicago and Wonkwang University, Korea.

Interfaith activities
In 1998 he established the “RELNET” website which delivers information on religions.

He has held UN-related positions for groups such as International Association for Religious Freedom, Religions for Peace and Japan UN Association. 

He served as General Secretary of the G8 Religious Leaders Summit and the International Religious Fellowship.

He gave a speech at the plenary session of the 3rd World Summit focused on “Religious Voices for Peace and Development” which took place on August 29, 2015, in Seoul.

And he also gave a speech at the para session of G20 Interfaith Summit 2015 which took place in 16–18 November 2015
Istanbul, Turkey.

His work in interfaith dialogue began after he met with Pope Paul VI in 1977, since when he has met many times with successive Popes and the Dalai Lama XIV, and attended interfaith conferences around the world.

Publishing
 The Living Of Peace  (1991, Heiwa Publishing)
 Mojibakeshita Rekishiwo Yomitoku  (2006, Bun’en-sha)
 Gendaino Shito Homuriwo Kangaeru  (2014, Minerva-shobo)
 KAZAMIDORI: How Humanity Has Confront Infectious Diseases (2019, Shuko-sha)
 Interfaith Worship And Prayer: We Must Pray Together (2019, Jessica Kingsley Publishers)
 Islamic State and Japan: What is the Nation (2019, Shuko-sha)
 Shinto DNA: How Much Do We Know About Japan (2020, Shuko-sha)

Discography
 The Power of Words The Power of Words SHINTO PRIEST REV. YOSHINOBU MIYAKE

References

External links
 RELNET (http://www.relnet.co.jp/)
 Konko Church of Izuo (http://www.relnet.co.jp/izuo/ )
 International Shinto Studies Association (http://www.shinto.org/worden/)

1958 births
Living people
Konkōkyō people